Augustus John Rush  (born December 15, 1942) is an internationally renowned psychiatrist. He is a professor emeritus in Duke-NUS Medical School at the National University of Singapore (NUS), and adjunct professor of psychiatry and behavioral sciences at Duke University School of Medicine. He has authored and edited more than 10 books, and over 600 scientific journal articles that are largely focused on the diagnosis and treatment of depressive and bipolar disorders.

Education and early life
Rush grew up in New Jersey with his younger sister. He graduated valedictorian from the Pingry School, an independent, college preparatory country day school in New Jersey. Rush earned his bachelor's degree in biochemistry, cum laude, from Princeton University in 1964, and his medical degree from the Columbia University College of Physicians & Surgeons in 1968. Following his general medical internship at Passavant Hospital, Northwestern University, Chicago, Illinois, he served as a general medical officer in the U.S. Army in Nuremberg, Germany. Following an additional year of government service in the Special Action Office for Drug Abuse Prevention in Washington, D.C., he completed his psychiatric residency at the Hospital of the University of Pennsylvania, Philadelphia, Pennsylvania. There, he established the Depression Clinic with Manoochehr Khatami, M D. He collaborated with his mentor Aaron T. Beck M.D. in the specification and initial testing of cognitive therapy for depression.

Career and research
As assistant professor in the Department of Psychiatry and Behavioral Sciences, University of Oklahoma, he led the third year medical student rotation in psychiatry and founded the Depression Clinic. He then joined the Department of Psychiatry, University of Texas Southwestern Medical Center at Dallas as associate professor, Professor and subsequently Vice Chair in Psychiatry. He was later also appointed Vice Chair and Professor in the Department of Clinical Sciences at UT Southwestern Medical Center at Dallas. Subsequently, as Professor and Vice Dean of Clinical Sciences at Duke-NUS Medical School in Singapore from 2008 to 2013, he established and developed specialized programs to launch and support patient-oriented research careers for clinicians by creating the Academic Medicine Research Institute, and a program in clinical research for third-year medical students.

His research has focused on the development and testing of innovative treatments for depressive and bipolar disorders including medications, medication combinations, somatic treatments, psychotherapy, and disease management protocols. Rush's work is widely recognized nationally and internationally, and has received awards from many professional organizations including the American College of Psychiatrists, American Psychopathological Association the National Alliance for Research in Schizophrenia and Affective Disorders, the American Psychiatric Association and the Society for Biological Psychiatry, among others. In 2014, Thomson Reuters recognized Dr. Rush as one of the “World’s Most Influential Scientific Minds”.

Selected awards and honors

 The 2014 American Society for Clinical Psychopharmacology (ASCP): Donald L Klein Lifetime Achievement Award
 The 2014 Thomson Reuters: World's Most Influential Scientific Minds
 The 2012 Duke-National University of Singapore (Duke-NUS): Outstanding Faculty for Clinical Sciences
 The 2007 National Alliance on Mental Illness (NAMI): Mind of America Scientific Research Award for outstanding lifetime contribution to the study of depression
 The 2007 American Psychiatric Association (APA): Award for Research in Psychiatry
 The 2006 American Medical Writers Association (AMWA): John P. McGovern Medal for preeminent contributions to biomedical communication
 The 2006 Society of Biological Psychiatry (SOBP): Gold Medal Award for lifetime research
 The 2003 National Alliance for the Mentally Ill: Professional of the Year Award
 The 2002 Society of Biological Psychiatry (SOBP): George N. Thompson Founders Award for Distinguished Service
 The 2000 National Alliance for Research on Schizophrenia and Depression (NARSAD): The Nola Maddox Falcone Prize for Outstanding Achievement in Affective Illness Research
 The 2000 Columbia College of Physicians & Surgeons: Dept. of Psychiatry, Edward J. Sachar Award
 The 2000 Mental Health Association of Texas: Ring of Honor
 The 2000 American Society for Psychosocial Research: Gerald Klerman Award
 The 1999 American College of Psychiatrists (ACP): Award for Research in Mood Disorders
 The 1999 American Psychopathological Association: Paul Hoch Award
 The 1998 National Depressive & Manic-Depressive Association (NDMDA): Outstanding Research in Affective Disorders Award
 The 1992 Institute of Living: C. Charles Burlingame Award for Outstanding Contributions to Psychiatric Research and Education
 The 1992 The Institute of Pennsylvania Hospital: Strecker Award

Works

Selected books 
 Rush, A.J., First, M.B., Blacker, D. (Eds.). Handbook of Psychiatric Measures, Second Edition. American Psychiatric Publishing Inc., 2008.
 Basco, M.R. and Rush, A.J. Cognitive-Behavioral Therapy for Bipolar Disorder, Second Edition. New York: Guilford Press, 2005; Paperback, 2007; first edition, 1996.	
 Rush, A.J. (Ed.). Mood Disorders: Systematic Medication Management. Modern Problems of Pharmacopsychiatry, Vol. 25. Basel, Switzerland: S. Karger, AG, 1997.	
 Wilkes, T.C.R., Belsher, G., Rush, A.J., Frank, E. and Associates. Cognitive Therapy for Depressed Adolescents. New York: Guilford Press, 1994.
 Rush, A.J. and Altshuler, K.Z. (Eds.), Depression: Basic Mechanisms, Diagnosis, and Treatment. New York: Guilford Press, 1986.
 Rush, A. J.Beating Depression. London: Century Publishing Co. Ltd. And New York: Facts on File Inc. 1983
 Rush, A.J. (Ed.) Short-term Psychotherapies for Depression. New York: Guilford Press, 1982
 Beck, A.T., Rush, A. J., Shaw, B. F. and Emory, G. Cognitive Therapy of Depression: New York, Guilford. Press, 1979.

Selected articles 
Rush, A.J., Trivedi, M.H., Stewart, J.W., Nierenberg, A.A., Fava, M., Kurian, B.T., Warden, D., Morris, D.W., Luther, J.F., Husain, M.M., Cook, I.A., Shelton R.C., Lesser, I.M., Kornstein, S.G., Wisniewski, S.R. Combining Medications to Enhance Depression Outcomes (CO-MED): Acute and long-term outcomes: A single-blind randomized study. American Journal of Psychiatry, 168: 689–701, 2011.
Williams, L., Rush, A.J., Koslow, S.H., Wisniewski, S.R., Cooper, N.J., Nemeroff, C.B., Schatzberg, A.F., Gordon, E. International study to predict optimized treatment for depression (iSPOT-D), a randomized clinical trial: Rationale and design. Trials, 12:4, 2011.
Rush, A.J., Trivedi, M.H., Ibrahim, H.M., Carmody, T.J., Arnow, B., Klein, D.N., Markowitz, J.C., Ninan, P.T., Kornstein, S., Manber, R., Thase, M.E., Kocsis, J.H. and Keller, M.B. The 16-item Quick Inventory of Depressive Symptomatology (QIDS) Clinician Rating (QIDS-C) and Self-Report (QIDS-SR): A psychometric evaluation in patients with chronic major depression. Biological Psychiatry, 54(5):573-583, 2003. [link]
Schatzberg, A.F., Rush, A.J., Arnow, B.A., Banks, P.L., Blalock, J.A., Borian, F.E., Howland, R., Klein, D.N., Kocsis, J.H., Kornstein, S.G., Manber, R., Markowitz, J.C., Miller, I., Ninan, P.T., Rothbaum, B.O., Thase, M.E., Trivedi, M.H., and Keller, M.B. Chronic depression: medication (nefazodone) or psychotherapy (CBASP) is effective when the other is not. Archives of General Psychiatry, 62(5):513-520, 2005.
Rush, A.J., Beck, A.T., Kovacs, M. and Hollon, S.D. Comparative efficacy of cognitive therapy and pharmacotherapy in the treatment of depressed outpatients. Cognitive Therapy and Research, 1:17-37, 1977. Reprinted in Annual Review of Behavior Therapy Theory and Practice, C.M. Franks and G.T. Wilson (Eds.), Brunner/Mazel Publications, New York, 1978.
Rush, A.J., Crismon, M.L., Kashner, T.M., Toprac, M.G., Carmody, T.J., Trivedi, M.H., Suppes, T., Miller, A.L., Biggs, M.M., Shores-Wilson, K., Witte, B.P., Shon, S.P., Rago, W.V. and Altshuler, K.Z. for the TMAP Research Group. Texas Medication Algorithm Project, Phase 3 (TMAP-3): Rationale and study design. Journal of Clinical Psychiatry, 64:357-369, 2003.
Rush, A.J., Kraemer, H.C., Sackeim, H.A., Fava, M., Trivedi, M.H., Frank, E., Ninan, P.T., Thase, M.E., Gelenberg, A.J., Kupfer, D.J., Regier, D.A., Rosenbaum, J.F., Ray, O. and Schatzberg, A.F. Report by the ACNP Task Force on response and remission in major depressive disorder. Neuropsychopharmacology, 31(9):1842-1853, 2006.
Trivedi, M.H., Rush, A.J., Crismon, M.L., Kashner, T.M., Toprac, M.G., Carmody, T.J., Key, T., Biggs, M.M., Shores-Wilson, K., Witte, B., Suppes, T., Miller, A.L., Altshuler, K.Z., and Shon, S.P. Clinical results for patients with major depressive disorder in the Texas Medication Algorithm Project (TMAP). Archives of General Psychiatry, 61(7):669-680, 2004
Adli, M., Bauer, M., Rush, A.J. Algorithms and collaborative-care systems for depression: Are they effective and why? A systematic review. Biological Psychiatry, 59(11):1029-1038, 2006.
Rush, A.J., Trivedi, M.H., Wisniewski, S.R., Nierenberg, A.A., Stewart, J.W., Warden, D., Niederehe, G., Thase, M.E., Lavori, P.W., Lebowitz, B.D., McGrath, P.J., Rosenbaum, J.F., Sackeim, H.A., Kupfer, D.J., Luther, J., Fava, M. Acute and longer-term outcomes in depressed outpatients requiring one or several treatment steps: a STAR*D report. American Journal of Psychiatry, 163:1905-1917, 2006.
Rush, A.J., Koran, L.M., Keller, M.B., Markowitz, J.C., Harrison, W.M., Miceli, R.J., Fawcett, J.A., Gelenberg, A.J., Hirschfeld, R.M.A., Klein, D.N., Kocsis, J.H., McCullough, J.P., Schatzberg, A.J. and Thase, M.E. The treatment of chronic depression, Part 1: Study design and rationale for evaluating the comparative efficacy of sertraline and imipramine as acute, crossover, continuation, and maintenance phase therapies. Journal of Clinical Psychiatry, 59:589-597, 1998.

Personal life
Rush has two sons, Matthew John Rush and Augustus John Rush III, and four grandchildren. He presently resides in Santa Fe, New Mexico, with his wife, Dee Miller Rush. He provides consultation to individuals as well as academic, governmental and industrial organizations.

See also
 Disease management (health)
 Psychotherapy
 Major depressive disorder
 Bipolar disorder
 Somatics

References

External links

(A. John Rush list of works and pubIications)
(A. John Rush interview with The Menninger Clinic)
(IDS-QIDS.org)

1942 births
American psychiatrists
Princeton University alumni
American Psychiatric Association
Columbia University Vagelos College of Physicians and Surgeons alumni
People from New Jersey
Living people
Academic staff of the National University of Singapore
University of Pennsylvania alumni
Duke University faculty
Place of birth missing (living people)
United States Army officers
Pingry School alumni